Ahu (also Romanized as Āhū) is a village in Khvoresh Rostam-e Jonubi Rural District, Khvoresh Rostam District, Khalkhal County, Ardabil Province, Iran. In the 2006 census, its population was recorded 94, in 21 families.

References 

Towns and villages in Khalkhal County